Oesyperus is a genus of beetles in the family Carabidae, containing the following species:

 Oesyperus planus Andrewes, 1923
 Oesyperus pygmaeus Andrewes, 1923
 Oesyperus unctulus Andrewes, 1923

References

Harpalinae